The Brinio class (sometimes referred to as Gruno class) was a class of three gunboats built by the Rijkswerf in Amsterdam for the Royal Netherlands Navy. The class comprised Gruno, Brinio and Friso.

Construction

Service history
All ships were still in service at the start of World War II. Only Gruno was able to escape to the United Kingdom. Friso was sunk by German bombers on 12 May 1940 on the IJsselmeer and Brinio was scuttled by her own crew on the IJsselmeer on 14 May 1940 after being damaged by a German aircraft.

References

External links
Description of class

Gunboat classes
World War II naval ships of the Netherlands